Paul Suter (9 March 1892 – 6 April 1966) was a Swiss cyclist. Between 1920 and 1926 he won five medals at the UCI Motor-paced World Championships, including a gold medal in 1923. He also won seven national titles in motor-paced racing (1920, 1921, 1923–1927).

Sutter had five brothers (Max, Franz, Fritz, Gottfried und Heiri), all competitive cyclists. In 1911, Paul and Franz together won the six-day race of Hamburg. Franz died in 1914 after being hit by a train while crossing a rail line, in front of Paul's eyes.

References

1892 births
1966 deaths
Swiss male cyclists
People from Aarau District
UCI Track Cycling World Champions (men)
Swiss track cyclists
Sportspeople from Aargau